Highway M09 is a Ukrainian international highway (M-highway) which is part of the Warsaw - Lviv route. It starts as a split-off from the M12 near Ternopil, runs through Lviv, then turns north and heads towards the border with Poland. The highway terminates at the border checkpoint Rava-Ruska. Across the Polish border it continues as National Road 17 (DK17). The entire route is part of European route E372.

History 
This route belonged until 1918 to the Austrian crown land of Galicia and was called the Żółkiewer Reichsstraße.

Route

See also

 Roads in Ukraine
 Ukraine Highways
 International E-road network
 Pan-European corridors

References

External links
 International Roads in Ukraine in Russian
 European Roads in Russian

Roads in Lviv Oblast
Roads in Ternopil Oblast